Kémoko Camara (born 4 May 1975) is a Guinean former professional footballer who played as a goalkeeper. He represented the Guinea national team between 1998 and 2013.

Club career
Camara was born in Conakry, Guinea.

In early March 2008, Camara signed a short-term deal with Dundee United of the Scottish Premier League, but despite being listed as a substitute on several occasions did not make a first team appearance and was released at the end of the season.

In December 2008, he played a competitive trial match for East Stirlingshire, after manager Jim McInally had previously had him on trial at Greenock Morton.

After leaving Ochilview Park, Camara moved to France to play with SO Cholet who won the sixth division (Division d'Honneur Atlantique) in France in the 2008–09 season.

International career
Camara was part of the Guinea team at the 2004 African Nations Cup, who finished second in their group in the first round of competition, before losing in the quarter finals to Mali. He was also selected in the Guinean 2008 African Nations Cup team, starting the first game against hosts Ghana.

References

External links
 
 

1975 births
Living people
Sportspeople from Conakry
Guinean footballers
Association football goalkeepers
Guinea international footballers
1998 African Cup of Nations players
2004 African Cup of Nations players
2006 Africa Cup of Nations players
2008 Africa Cup of Nations players
Guinée Championnat National players
Belgian Pro League players
Challenger Pro League players
Israeli Premier League players
Liga Leumit players
South African Premier Division players
Scottish Football League players
AS Kaloum Star players
K.R.C. Zuid-West-Vlaanderen players
Bnei Sakhnin F.C. players
Maccabi Ahi Nazareth F.C. players
Hafia FC players
AmaZulu F.C. players
Dundee United F.C. players
East Stirlingshire F.C. players
SO Cholet players
Horoya AC players
Guinean expatriate footballers
Guinean expatriate sportspeople in Belgium
Expatriate footballers in Belgium
Guinean expatriate sportspeople in Israel
Expatriate footballers in Israel
Guinean expatriate sportspeople in South Africa
Expatriate soccer players in South Africa
Guinean expatriate sportspeople in Scotland
Expatriate footballers in Scotland
Guinean expatriate sportspeople in France
Expatriate footballers in France